The Channel Four/MOMI animator in residence scheme was housed in the MOMI on the South Bank. Starting in 1990. It ran for thirteen years commissioning over forty films which were transmitted throughout the World. The scheme was the brainchild of Channel Four Television Corporation commissioning editor for animation, Clare Kitson.

Funded by Channel Four, it ran a competition in which graduates came up with storylines and concepts for films of which four would be developed into a full Channel Four commission. The winners had to work in full view of the public in the 'goldfish bowl', a three-meter (10') square glass box in the heart of the MOMI.

The scheme's first production advisor/producer was Lisa Beattie. She oversaw the productions from 1992 to 1999. After her departure was replaced by Chris Shepherd who took on the role starting 1999 till the scheme moved to the National Media Museum in 2004.

Notable directors to have completed the scheme included Stephen Harding-Hill, Anthony Hodgson, Leigh Hodgkinson, Lizzie Oxby, Ruth Lingford, Chris Shepherd, Brian Wood.

Films
1992
 Big Cheese by Sam Fell
 The Mill by Petra Freeman
 Never Say Pink Fury Die by Louise Spraggon
 Prayer to Viracocha by Marie Cecille Pattison
1993
 Chicken Wire by Sara Roper
 Angry George Irons by Steven Harding Hill
 Not Without My Handbag by Boris Kossmehl
 Mama Lou by Maybelle Peters
1994
 Growing by Alison Hemstock
 Fairest Of Them All by Jason Stalman
 El Caminante by Debra Smith
 Ice Cream And Jelly And A Punch In The Belly by Suzanne Cohen & Lesley Bushell
1995
 The Broken Jaw by Chris Shepherd
 Touch Wood by Vivienne Jones
 Final Communique by Gail Thomas
 Angel by Colin Waddell
1996
 Death And The Mother by Ruth Lingford
 Glasgow Kiss by SAm Moore
 Combination Skin by Anthony Hodson
 Dead Cow Farm by John Parry
1997
 Deviant! by Eoin Clarke
 School Disco by Brian Wood
 Andares In Time Of War by Alejandra J. Lopez
 Naja Goes To School by Shilpa Ranade 
1998
 Cri by Thorsten Rienth
 Toby The Square Boy by Gary Hawkins
 Beelines by Rachel Bevan Baker
 Akbar's Cheetah by Iain Gardner

References

External links
Animation At The Museum Of The Moving Image

Channel 4